Betty Go-Belmonte Street is a street running through the New Manila district of Quezon City, Philippines. It is a notable road in a generally northwest-southeast orientation between the junction with E. Rodriguez Sr. Avenue in New Manila and the junction with N. Domingo Street also in New Manila. It is served by Betty Go-Belmonte station of the Manila Line 2.

The street was named after a notable Filipino journalist who was an institution with her contributions in the writing press during the Martial Law period as well as one of the founders of two of the major broadsheet newspaper in the country namely The Philippine Daily Inquirer and The Philippine Star. She was also the wife of former Quezon City Mayor and House Speaker Feliciano Belmonte Jr.

Until 1997, the street located in Mariana and Immaculate Conception was called Valley Road. In 2016, a resolution was passed by the Quezon City Council to name the full length of the street to N. Domingo Street as Betty Go-Belmonte Street.

Route
Betty Go-Belmonte Street commences at the intersection with E. Rodriguez Sr. Avenue in the north. It heads due southeast, crossing Poinsettia Street and Ilang-Ilang Street. Then it straightens up and crosses Cannon Street and Bougainvilla Street. Then it travels southeast again crossing with Lantana Street and Acacia Street. Then it turns east and crosses Rosal Street and Rosario Drive before turning south again before it crosses Aurora Boulevard. After crossing Aurora Boulevard, Betty Go-Belmonte goes further southeast again crossing with Manggahan Street. It then terminates at the junction with N. Domingo Street wherein a short turn in the southwest it continues further as P. Tuazon Boulevard.

A notable establishment on Betty Go-Belmonte Street is Holy Spirit School Cubao.

See also
 Aurora Boulevard

References

Streets in Quezon City